EPRI, is an American independent, nonprofit organization that conducts research and development related to the generation, delivery, and use of electricity to help address challenges in the energy industry, including reliability, efficiency, affordability, health, safety, and the environment.

EPRI's principal offices and laboratories are located in Palo Alto, California; Charlotte, North Carolina; Knoxville, Tennessee; Washington, DC; and Lenox, Massachusetts.

History
In November 1965, the Great Northeastern Blackout left 30 million people in the United States without electricity. Historic in scale and impact, it demonstrated the nation's growing dependence upon electricity and its vulnerability to power loss. The event marked a watershed moment for the U.S. electricity sector and triggered the creation of the Electric Power Research Institute.

Following the blackout, leaders in Congress held hearings in the early 1970s about the lack of research supporting the power industry.

Dr. Chauncey Starr, then the Dean of the UCLA School of Engineering and Applied Science, led the initiative, proposed by Congress, to create an independent research and development organization to support the electricity sector and address its technical and operational challenges. In 1972, at a formal hearing of the U.S. Senate Commerce Committee, Starr presented a vision for the Electric Power Research Institute to serve Congress's mandate for objective, scientific research. Starr served as the first President of EPRI for five years and formally retired at age 65, but continued to work at EPRI for the next 30 years.

Research 
According to EPRI's 2018 Research Portfolio, EPRI's work encompasses research in technology, the workforce, operations, systems planning and other areas that guide and support the development of new regulatory frameworks, market opportunities, and value to energy consumers.

Generation 
EPRI's generation research focuses on information, processes and technologies to improve the flexibility, reliability, performance, and efficiency of the existing fossil-fueled and renewable energy generating fleet.

Nuclear 
EPRI conducts research on nuclear cost-effective technologies, technical guidance, and knowledge transfer tools to help maximize the value of existing nuclear assets and inform the deployment of new nuclear technology.

Power Delivery and Utilization 
EPRI's distributed energy resources and customer research area focuses on distributed energy resource (DER) integration, efficient electrification, connectivity and information technology enabling an integrated grid and cyber security guidance.

The transmission, distribution, and substation research focuses on improving transmission asset management analytics, technology for mobile field guides, robotics and sensors to automate asset inspections, and improving understanding of electromagnetic pulse (EMP).

Technology Innovation 
EPRI researches and develops early-stage and breakthrough technologies that could lead to promising concepts, new knowledge, and potential breakthroughs.

See also
 NOREM
 Central Power Research Institute

References

External links
Official EPRI—Electric Power Research Institute  website
EPRI Portfolio
EPRI Journal

Energy research institutes
Engineering research institutes
Electric power in the United States
Energy in California
Research institutes in the San Francisco Bay Area
Non-profit organizations based in Palo Alto, California
1973 establishments in California
Research institutes established in 1973